Dominic Michael Joseph Rossi is global chief investment officer of equities for Fidelity International. He was previously with Gartmore.

Rossi received his BA from the University of Sussex in 1985 and his MBA in 1993 from City University of Seattle.

References

External links
Dominic Rossi talking.

Living people
Chief investment officers
Fidelity International
Alumni of the University of Sussex
City University of Seattle alumni
Year of birth missing (living people)